Wanap or Kayik is a Torricelli language of Papua New Guinea.

References

Palei languages
Languages of Sandaun Province